The 1998 HEW Cyclassics was the third edition of the HEW Cyclassics cycle race and was held on 16 August 1998. The race started and finished in Hamburg. The race was won by Léon van Bon.

General classification

References

1998
1998 in German sport
August 1998 sports events in Europe
1998 in road cycling
1998 UCI Road World Cup